Saša Balić (born 29 January 1990) is a Montenegrin professional footballer who plays as a defender. Besides Montenegro, he has played in Serbia, Croatia, Ukraine, Romania, Bosnia and Herzegovina, and Poland.

Club career
Balić started his career at FK Bokelj before moving to the Serbian side OFK Beograd where he spent the 2007–08 season before moving to FK Grbalj in July 2008. After spending a season with Grbalj, he was released in June 2009 and later joined Croatian side NK Inter Zaprešić in November 2009, although his transfer will come into effect during the winter transfer period so he will be eligible to play for Inter after the winter break of the 2009–10 season.

In late February 2012 Balić signed a four-year contract with FC Kryvbas Kryvyi Rih.

On 27 July 2017, he signed a contract with Zagłębie Lubin. On 25 May 2022, after five years at the club, which included Balić serving as the team's captain in 2021, it was announced he would leave Zagłębie at the end of June 2022.

On 21 June 2022, Balić joined newly promoted Ekstraklasa club Korona Kielce, signing a one-year contract. He left the club by mutual consent on 1 March 2023.

International career
He made his debut for Montenegro in a March 2011 friendly match against Uzbekistan and has earned a total of 13 caps, scoring no goals. His final international was a November 2020 friendly match against Kazakhstan.

Career statistics

Club

International

References

External links
 

1990 births
Living people
People from Kotor
Association football fullbacks
Montenegrin footballers
Montenegro youth international footballers
Montenegro under-21 international footballers
Montenegro international footballers
OFK Beograd players
OFK Grbalj players
NK Inter Zaprešić players
FC Kryvbas Kryvyi Rih players
FC Metalurh Zaporizhzhia players
ASA 2013 Târgu Mureș players
FK Sarajevo players
CFR Cluj players
Zagłębie Lubin players
Korona Kielce players
Serbian SuperLiga players
Montenegrin First League
Croatian Football League players
Ukrainian Premier League players
Liga I players
Premier League of Bosnia and Herzegovina players
Ekstraklasa players
III liga players
Montenegrin expatriate footballers
Expatriate footballers in Serbia
Montenegrin expatriate sportspeople in Serbia
Expatriate footballers in Croatia
Montenegrin expatriate sportspeople in Croatia
Expatriate footballers in Ukraine
Montenegrin expatriate sportspeople in Ukraine
Expatriate footballers in Romania
Montenegrin expatriate sportspeople in Romania
Expatriate footballers in Bosnia and Herzegovina
Montenegrin expatriate sportspeople in Bosnia and Herzegovina
Expatriate footballers in Poland
Montenegrin expatriate sportspeople in Poland